Louis-Joseph Daumas (1801–1887) was a French sculptor and medallist.

Born in Toulon, Daumas was admitted into the École nationale supérieure des Beaux-Arts in 1826, and entered the atelier of David d'Angers.

Daumas's work includes:

 Genius of Navigation, bronze statue of French Admiral Jules de Cuverville with four bas-reliefs on the base, port of Toulon, 1847, reconstructed after its destruction in World War II
 exterior statue of François Eudes de Mézeray, Cour Napoléon in the Louvre, Paris, prior to 1853
 Roman cavalier and his horse, on the left bank of the Pont d'Iéna, Paris, 1853
 equestrian statue of José de San Martín in the Plaza San Martín of Buenos Aires, 1862, with copies at the Parque del Oeste in Madrid, Central Park in New York City, and Parc Montsouris in Paris and in Washington, D.C., United States
 equestrian sculpture at the Sakıp Sabancı Museum, Istanbul, 1864

References

External links
 

1801 births
1887 deaths
Artists from Toulon
École des Beaux-Arts alumni
19th-century French sculptors
French male sculptors
19th-century French male artists